The 31st Golden Melody Awards  take place in Taipei, Taiwan in 2020. The ceremony was scheduled for 27 June 2020, but rescheduled to 3 October, due to the COVID-19 pandemic, and moved to the Taipei Music Center.

Winners and nominees 
Below is the list of winners and nominees for the popular music categories.

References

2020 in Taiwan
2020 music awards
Golden Melody Awards
Music events postponed due to the COVID-19 pandemic
October 2020 events in Asia